CARE Hospitals is a chain of multi-specialty healthcare hospitals with 14 hospitals in 6 cities across 5 states of India.

History
CARE Hospitals was founded in 1997 by Bhupathiraju Somaraju, Chairman and Managing Director of CARE Hospitals Group. CARE Hospital is a specialty hospital for cardiac surgeons, critical care specialists, and emergency medicine specialists.

Locations
CARE Hospitals has branches in Banjara Hills, HITEC City (Gachibowli).

Main crew members 
CARE hospitals Main crew involves "Dr.B.Soma Raju" Chairman & Managing Director, "Dr.N.Krishna Reddy" Vice-Chairman and their crew.

References

External links
 Official website of CARE Hospitals

Hospital networks in India
1997 establishments in Andhra Pradesh
Hospitals in Hyderabad, India
Hospitals in Visakhapatnam